Belville is a townland in County Westmeath, Ireland.

Belville is one of a number townlands of the Irish civil parish of Ballyloughloe in the barony of Clonlonan in the Province of Leinster. 

In the 1911 census of Ireland, it was spelt "Bellville" and there were four houses and fourteen inhabitants in the townland.

References

External links
The IreAtlas Townland Data Base

Townlands of County Westmeath